Applause (Danish: Applaus) is a 2009 Danish film starring Paprika Steen from director/co-writer Martin Peter Zandvliet and Koncern Film. It tells the story of an actress's journey to reclaim her life and her family from the ravages of alcoholism and divorce.

Plot
The critically acclaimed and alcoholic actress Thea Barfoed has gone through turmoil, resulting in a divorce and the loss of custody of her two boys.  Eager to break with the past, regain control over her life, and get her children back, she uses charm and manipulation to persuade her ex-husband, Christian, that she is ready and able to take back the mantle of motherhood; but she has not completely convinced herself. On stage, Thea plays Martha, the aggressive and wounded wife in Who's Afraid of Virginia Woolf?  Off stage, the actress is mixed up in a drama that has many of the same tragic, toxic ingredients.  As Thea contends with the rigorous demands of stage life and a past that haunts her, she must face her inner demons. But what she and her family both know is that Thea is Thea, a prima donna better suited to acting her heart out than living an ordinary life.

Cast
 Paprika Steen as Thea Barfoed
 Michael Falch as Christian Barfoed
 Otto Leonardo Steen Rieks as William Barfoed
 Noel Koch-Søfeldt as Matthias Barfoed
 Lars Brygmann as George
 Johanne Dam as Pige på café
 Michael Kastrupsen as AA mand
 Uffe Rørbæk Madsen as Peter
 Sara-Marie Maltha as Maiken
 Malou Reymann as Påklædersken
 Shanti Roney as Tom
 Annette Rossing as Pige på café
 Henriette Rossing as Bardame (bartender)
 Nanna Tange as Ekspedient
 Nikolaj Lie Kaas as Skuespiller (uncredited)

Release
The film was released in Denmark on September 25, 2009.  North American distributor World Wide Motion Pictures Corporation released the film theatrically on December 3, 2010 in Los Angeles and had a wider release in Los Angeles and New York on January 21, 2011. The film was shown at the European Union Film Festival on March 20 and 23, 2011 and River City Cinema,Maine on April 8, 2011. The film will be shown at the Minneapolis/ St. Paul International Film Festival on April 21 and 24, 2011. A general run in South Florida began on April 22, 2011, and in Austin, San Antonio, & Denver on September 16, 2011.

Critical response

Premiering at the Karlovy Vary Film Festival in the Czech Republic in July 2009 and continuing on the international festival circuit, Applaus received critical acclaim and was recognized with numerous awards. CNN's Neil Curry named the picture as one of four Danish films to watch, film critic Roger Ebert called Paprika Steen's performance “extraordinary," Variety's Alyssa Simon hailed it as "fearless and tour-de-force", The Los Angeles Times reviewer Betsy Sharkey called Paprika Steen's performance "Deeply affecting...unflinchingly real." Entertainment Weekly' Lisa Schwarzbaum said ""Paprika Steen brings a thrilling emotional nakedness and...unsentimental honesty to the part." and The New York Times''' Karen Durbin called Paprika Steen's performance "one of the best screen performances of the year".

AccoladesApplaus has received several film festival awards, including:Zurich Film Festival - Critics' Choice AwardNashville Film Festival - Bridgestone Grand Jury Prize for Best Actress in Narrative Feature: Paprika SteenHamptons International Film Festival - Outstanding Achievement in Acting: Paprika SteenKarlovy Vary International Film Festival - Best Actress: Paprika SteenRobert Award - Best Actress: Paprika SteenZulu Awards - Best Actress: Paprika SteenMumbai International Film Festival - Best Actress: Paprika SteenRouen Nordic Film Festival - "Deuxième Souffle" Award: Martin Zandvliet

References

External links
 
  
  
 Applause'' at Eurochannel

Danish drama films
2009 films